Nicholas Barton may refer to:

 Nick Barton (born 1955), British evolutionary biologist
 Nicholas Barton (filmmaker) (born 1983), American filmmaker